Musa coccinea, commonly known as scarlet banana or red-flowering banana, is a species of flowering plant in the banana and plantain family Musaceae, native to tropical China (in Guangdong, Guangxi, and southeastern Yunnan) and Vietnam. It is a bat-pollinated evergreen perennial, placed in section Callimusa (now including the former section Australimusa), having a diploid chromosome number of 2n = 20.

The flower cluster is more rounded than in the related species M. beccarii. It is made up of erect spirals of red bracts which enclose tubular yellow flowers. The species is cultivated for its ornamental value, being grown, for example, along with heliconias in commercial farms in Hawaii. It does not tolerate temperatures below , so in temperate zones requires protection during the winter months. In the UK it has gained the Royal Horticultural Society’s Award of Garden Merit.

M. coccinea is a known host in the New World of the red palm mite (Raoiella indica).

Taxonomy

Musa coccinea was described by Andrews in 1799. M. uranoscopos Lour. (an illegitimate name) is often incorrectly given as a synonym. Loureiro's 1790 account is confused. He refers to an illustration in Rumphius' 1747 Herbarium Amboinense, hence this is the type of his name. However, this illustration had previously been used in Linnaeus' description of M. troglodytarum, so M. uranoscopos Lour. is a superfluous name for M. troglodytarum. Loureiro's description   of M. coccinea; however the type rather than the description determines the synonymity, so M. uranoscopos Lour. is not a synonym of M. coccinea.

References

External links 
Pictures from PlantSystematics.Org
Scarlet banana in flower
Closer view of inflorescences

coccinea
Plants described in 1799
Flora of China
Flora of Vietnam
Garden plants
Taxa named by Henry Cranke Andrews